Jayuni (Aymara jayu salt, -ni a suffix to indicate ownership, "the one with salt", also spelled Jayune) is a mountain in the Andes of Peru, about  high. It is located in the Ayacucho Region, Lucanas Province, in the north of the Chipao District. Jayuni lies northwest of Qarwarasu and Sallqan Tiwa.

References

Mountains of Peru
Mountains of Ayacucho Region